The 2001 Polish Speedway season was the 2001 season of motorcycle speedway in Poland.

Individual

Polish Individual Speedway Championship
The 2001 Individual Speedway Polish Championship final was held on 15 August at Bydgoszcz.

Golden Helmet
The 2001 Golden Golden Helmet organised by the Polish Motor Union (PZM) was the 2001 event for the league's leading riders. The final was held at Wrocław on the 21 September.

Junior Championship
 winner - Jarosław Hampel

Silver Helmet
 winner - Rafał Okoniewski

Bronze Helmet
 winner - Rafał Szombierski

Pairs

Polish Pairs Speedway Championship
The 2001 Polish Pairs Speedway Championship was the 2001 edition of the Polish Pairs Speedway Championship. The final was held on 22 June at Piła.

Team

Team Speedway Polish Championship
The 2001 Team Speedway Polish Championship was the 2001 edition of the Team Polish Championship. Apator Toruń won the gold medal.

Ekstraliga

First round

Results

Final round

Upper Group

Lower Group

1.Liga

2.Liga

Promotion/relegation play offs
RKM Rybnik v Unia Leszno 49:40, 38:52
Ostrów v Opole 40:50, 44:46

References

Poland Individual
Poland Team
Speedway
2001 in Polish speedway